Giaever may refer to
Ivar Giaever, Norwegian-American Nobel laureate in physics
Giaever Glacier in Antarctica 
Giaever Ridge in Antarctica 
Giæver, a Norwegian surname

fr:Giæver